Yangzhou fried rice (Traditional Chinese: 揚州炒飯; Simplified Chinese : 扬州炒饭; Pinyin : Yángzhōu chǎofàn, Jyutping: Joeng4zau1 Caau2faan6) is a popular Chinese-style wok fried rice dish in many Chinese restaurants throughout the world. It is commonly sold in the UK as special fried rice, in the US as house special fried rice, and in Vietnam as cơm chiên dương châu.

Ingredients
The difference between Yangzhou fried rice and ordinary fried rice is that Yangzhou style invariably includes a combination of proteins. Rather than using a single protein like shrimp or pork or chicken as the dominant ingredient in fried rice, Yangzhou uses a variety. Most commonly used is a combination of pork, shrimp and frequently chicken or duck. Ordinarily, some of its staple items include:

 Cooked rice (preferably day-old, because freshly cooked rice is too sticky due to higher water content)
 Chinese-style roast pork or lap cheong
 Some sort of seafood, generally shrimp
 Roasted or boiled chicken, duck or other protein
 Scallions (spring onions or green onions), chopped, including green end
 Fresh vegetables such as kai-lan, carrots, peas, corn, and bamboo shoots
 Egg

The peas may be a replacement or an addition for the green onions. Some recipes include Shaoxing wine. Some western Chinese restaurants also use soy sauce to flavor the rice, and add meat such as chicken.

History
Despite the name, this dish did not originate in Yangzhou, Jiangsu (Yangchow; Yeung Chow). The recipe was invented by Qing China's Yi Bingshou (1754–1815) and the dish was named Yeung Chow fried rice since Yi was once the regional magistrate of Yangzhou Still, there have been attempts by people in Yangzhou to patent the dish .

Failed world record attempt
In October 2015, as part of the 2,500th anniversary of the town of Yangzhou, an attempt was made in Yangzhou at beating the previous world record for fried rice set in 2014 by the Turkey culinary federation. The organizers initially planned to send the end product to five companies for consumption by their staff. As per the organizers' intents, the rest was sent to local canteens. However, due to a part of it being sent to feed animals, the world record attempt was disqualified, as a Guinness World Records spokesman said that it had become obvious that the dish was not fit for human consumption.

See also
 List of Chinese dishes
 List of fried rice dishes

References

 

American Chinese cuisine
American rice dishes
Canadian Chinese cuisine
Cantonese cuisine
Chinese rice dishes
Fried rice
Hong Kong cuisine
Macau cuisine
Yangzhou
American pork dishes